'The Castelló d'Empúries Flour Mill and Eco-Museum' is a factory that was open from the late 19th century and during the first half of the 20th century, built on the remains of three medieval flour mills. The Museum opened to the public in 1998, following a renovation carried out by the municipality. It was converted into an ecomuseum with displays covering the flour industry in Catalonia and the great changes that took place in flour production during the second half of the 19th century. It is part of the network of Science and Technology Museums of Catalonia.

References

This article is partially or entirely extracted from the website "Visitmuseum" of the Agència Catalana del Patrimoni Cultural. The text was placed by the author or the person in charge of publication under the Creative Commons Attribution-ShareAlike License or a compatible license.

External links

Museums in Girona
Buildings and structures in the Province of Girona